Aaron Abril Galarrita Aban (born April 8, 1982) is a Filipino professional basketball player for the Sta. Rosa Laguna Lions of the Pilipinas Super League. Born in Cagayan de Oro, he graduated his high school at Liceo de Cagayan University and went to Colegio de San Juan de Letran in college.

He is a former player of the Letran Knights in the NCAA and the Toyota Otis-Letran Sparks in the Philippine Basketball League. He joined the team in 2002 but after a solid performance in the 2003 NCAA Finals grew in success.

He was drafted seventh overall by the Alaska Aces in the 2006 PBA draft. In 2008, he was signed by the Purefoods Tender Juicy Giants. During the offseason of 35th season, he was traded to Burger King Titans in exchange of Rey Evangelista. Before the start of the 2010 Fiesta Conference, he was signed by the Talk N' Text Tropang Texters as a free agent.

In 2019, Aban came out from retirement to play for the 2019–20 ABL season, suiting up for San Miguel Alab Pilipinas.

References

1982 births
Living people
Alaska Aces (PBA) draft picks
Alaska Aces (PBA) players
Barako Bull Energy players
Basketball players from Misamis Oriental
Filipino men's basketball players
Letran Knights basketball players
Magnolia Hotshots players
NorthPort Batang Pier players
San Miguel Alab Pilipinas players
Shooting guards
Small forwards
Sportspeople from Cagayan de Oro
TNT Tropang Giga players